Liar, Liar, Vampire is a 2015 comedy family film that was released on October 12, 2015 through Nickelodeon. The film was directed by Vince Marcello and stars Rahart Adams as a young student that is mistaken for a vampire and decides to encourage the mistake in order to keep his newfound popularity.

Story
When he transfers to a new school from Australia, Davis is concerned about the same things that most teenagers are, such as fitting in and finding new friends. However, soon after he arrives, the most popular girl in school, Caitlyn, mistakenly identifies him as a vampire – something that turns Davis into an almost instant celebrity. Not wanting to lose out on his new popularity, Davis persuades his next-door neighbor Vi into helping him continue the charade.

Cast 
Rahart Adams as Davis Pell
Brec Bassinger as Vi
Tiera Skovbye as Caitlyn Crisp
Larissa Albuquerque as Bethany
Sarah Grey as Not Caitlyn
Drew Tanner as Singer
Pauline Egan as Beverly Pell
Alex Zahara as Baron Von Awesome
Samuel Patrick Chu as Ashton
Olivia Ryan Stern as Rita
Ty Wood as Bon
Tina Georgieva as Australian Student
Will Erichson as Rayzon
Harrison MacDonald as Stuart
Curtis Albright as Jelly

Reception 
Common Sense Media rated the film at three stars, writing that it was "silly and self-effacing, but it does well to illustrate the importance of being yourself and surrounding yourself with people who appreciate the real you."

References

External links
 

2015 television films
2015 films
American children's fantasy films
Canadian comedy television films
Films shot in Scotland
Canadian fantasy films
2010s children's comedy films
Nickelodeon original films
Vampire comedy films
2010s children's fantasy films
English-language Canadian films
Films directed by Vince Marcello
American comedy television films
2010s American films
2010s Canadian films